William Lee (born William Lubovsky; August 6, 1908 – December 7, 1982) was an American actor who appeared in numerous television and film roles, but was best known for playing Mr. Hooper, the original store proprietor of the eponymous Hooper's Store. He was one of the four original human characters on Sesame Street, from the show's debut in November 1969 until his death on December 7, 1982 at the age of 74.

Early career
Lee was born to a Jewish family in Brooklyn, New York. His father, a bookbinder, lost his job due to economic changes. Will Lee came to adulthood during the Great Depression. He worked odd jobs in New York City and absorbed the intellectual atmosphere of Greenwich Village, an enclave of avant-garde culture where small presses, art galleries, and experimental theater throve. He began his career as a character actor on stage. He was a member of the Group Theater in the 1930s and appeared in Johnny Johnson, Night Music, Boy Meets Girl, The Time of Your Life (as Willie the pinball machine addict) and other Broadway plays. He succeeded John Garfield as the lead in Golden Boy. He also was involved in the Workers Lab Theatre, by presenting plays that supported the labor movement and social justice.

Lee was co-founder of the Theater of Action and a member of the Federal Theatre Project. During World War II, he served in Army Special Services in Australia and Manila and was cited twice for directing and staging shows for troops overseas, as well as teaching acting classes. After the war, he appeared Off Broadway in Norman Mailer's The Deer Park (as movie mogul Teppis) and on Broadway in The Shrike, Once Upon a Mattress, Carnival!,  Incident At Vichy and The World of Sholom Aleichem.

Blacklist and teaching
Lee also began appearing in movies, including bit parts in Casbah, A Song Is Born, Little Fugitive, and  Saboteur. He was blacklisted as an alleged communist and barred from movies and on TV for five years during the era of McCarthyism, according to members of his family. He had been active in the Actor's Workshop and had been an unfriendly witness before the House Un-American Activities Committee hearings in 1950 investigating Communist elements in show business. At the end of that period, in 1956, he landed the role of Grandpa Hughes in As the World Turns; however, the role was later recast with Santos Ortega.

He taught at the American Theatre Wing for nine years (including among his students James Earl Jones), as well as at the New School for Social Research, Boston University, and the Uta Hagen-Herbert Berghof Studio. In addition, he conducted his own acting classes. Outside of Sesame Street, later roles included TV movies and a supporting role as the judge in the 1983 movie Daniel. Lee also worked in commercials, including a spot for Atari, as a grandfather learning to play Pac-Man from his granddaughter and spots for Ocean Spray juice.

Impact of Mr. Hooper
In 1969, he pursued the role of Mr. Hooper on the popular children's show Sesame Street. "He gave millions of children the message that the old and the young have a lot to say to each other," said Joan Ganz Cooney, president of the Children's Television Workshop (later known as Sesame Workshop). The New York Times reported that on Sesame Street, Lee's Mr. Hooper ranked ahead of all live cast members in recognition by young audiences, according to a survey. His bowtie and hornrimmed reading glasses became his trademark.

In a November 1970 TIME article, following the show's first season, Lee recalled his feelings about the show: 

In addition to being a staple of Sesame Street for more than 10 years, Lee played Mr. Hooper in TV specials (Christmas Eve on Sesame Street and A Special Sesame Street Christmas), guest appearances (Evening at Pops: 1971), stage appearances, countless record albums, and parades, including the 1982 Macy's Thanksgiving Day Parade on November 25, 1982. It was revealed in Christmas Eve on Sesame Street that Mr. Hooper is Jewish, as was Lee himself. Lee taped his final segments as Mr. Hooper on Wednesday November 24, 1982, two weeks prior to his death. This would become the focal point of Episode 1839, which aired a year later to the date, in which Mr. Hooper's death is explained to Big Bird, who had a particularly close relationship with Mr. Hooper, by the adults.

According to his obituary in The New York Times, as he became known on Sesame Street, children would approach him on the street and ask, "How did you get out of the television set?" or whisper, "I love you." "Apart from the joy of knowing that you are helping so many kids, the recognition is heartwarming," Lee was quoted as saying in 1981.

Death of Mr. Hooper
Following Lee's death, the producers of Sesame Street were uncertain how to acknowledge the death of one of the series' most visible actors. After considering a number of options (replacing or filling in for Lee with a new actor —so Mr. Hooper could still be in the show— or explaining that he could move interstate, quit, or having him retire), Sesame Workshop decided to have the character of Mr. Hooper die as well. Then they created an episode that dealt with the difficult topic of death.

Episode 1839, now known as "Farewell, Mr. Hooper," aired on November 24, 1983 (Thanksgiving Day) and was quickly selected by the Daytime Emmys as being one of the 10 most influential moments in daytime television. Before the broadcast ended, a picture of Lee was shown, along with the dates of his birth and death and the writing "In Loving Memory of Will Lee" before fading out.

The cast of Sesame Street were saddened by Lee's death, as over the time Lee had played his signature character on TV, he had befriended most of the cast. The cast said that their characters' sad faces were real but they went through with their performance, remembering they were doing it for a good outcome. Caroll Spinney (Big Bird and Oscar the Grouch) said that the last time he saw Lee alive was during the taping of the last episode involving Mr. Hooper in November 1982. Lee felt ill that day and barely spoke to the cast. Spinney (who was wearing Big Bird's feet at the time) placed his arm around Lee's shoulder and said "I love you, Mr. Hooper." Lee replied, "And I love you, Caroll." Lee died a few days later.

In an interview a few years later, Loretta Long, who played Susan, said of the episode's legacy: "People come up to us and say 'Thank you. Now we can explain what happened to Grandma, what happened to Grandpa.'"

Death
Lee died on December 7, 1982, at the age of 74, from a heart attack at Lenox Hill Hospital in New York City.  Lee was never married and had no children. According to his obituary, he was survived by his sister Sophie Lee Lubov, who lived in Florida. The Sesame Street episode "Farewell, Mr. Hooper", episode 1839, was released 11 months later and is dedicated to Lee.

Filmography

Film

Television

See also
 History of Sesame Street

References

External links
 
 
 
 The Will Lee papers at the American Heritage Center

1908 births
1982 deaths
United States Army personnel of World War II
American male soap opera actors
American male film actors
American male television actors
Hollywood blacklist
American acting coaches
Jewish American male actors
Male actors from New York City
People from Brooklyn
20th-century American male actors
United States Army soldiers
20th-century American Jews
Federal Theatre Project people